Elm Park station may refer to:
 Elm Park station (Staten Island Railway), a rapid transit station on the Staten Island Railway
 Elm Park tube station, a tube station in London